Global Communications Academy is an International Baccalaureate school in Hartford, Connecticut that is partnered with Say Yes to Education. It is part of Hartford Public Schools. The school opened on August 25, 2008. It is now officially a Pre-K-12 school as the Class of 2016 graduation to place June 6, 2016.

External links 
 GCA on Hartford Public Schools website

References 

Schools in Hartford, Connecticut
Educational institutions established in 2008
2008 establishments in Connecticut